The Lance Burton Theatre was located in the Monte Carlo Resort and Casino. Its 1,274 seats were arranged in three main sections: the main floor, the mezzanine, and the balcony. The theatre was specially built for Lance Burton's magic show and until 2010 hosted Lance Burton: Master Magician.

On October 22, 2001, the theater was the host site for the release of the USPS Harry Houdini  stamp.

Entertainment 
In addition to Lance Burton's magic show five days a week, the theater hosts a weekly Vintage Vegas Show with Chris Phillips and Marley Taylor, and Frank Caliendo for 4 shows a week.

Notes

External links
Lance Burton: Master Magician

Buildings and structures in Paradise, Nevada
Theatres in Nevada
Park MGM
1996 establishments in Nevada